The anterior medial malleolar artery (medial anterior malleolar artery, internal malleolar artery) is an artery in the ankle. It arises about 5 cm. above the ankle-joint from the anterior tibial artery.

The anterior medial malleolar artery passes behind the tendons of the extensor hallucis longus and tibialis anterior muscles, to the medial side of the ankle, upon which it ramifies, anastomosing with branches of the posterior tibial and medial plantar arteries and with the medial calcaneal from the posterior tibial.

References

External links
 http://www.dartmouth.edu/~humananatomy/figures/chapter_17/17-3.HTM 

Arteries of the lower limb